Tezpur College, established in 1965, is a undergraduate, coeducational college situated in Tezpur, Assam. The college is affiliated with the guahati University.

Departments

Departments at the college include Assamese, Bengali, English, Bodo, Sanskrit, History, Education, Economics, Philosophy, Political Science, Hindi, Geography, and Commerce.

References

External links
Tezpur is a city and urban agglomeration in Sonitpur district, Assam state, India. Tezpur is located on the banks of the river Brahmaputra, 175 kilometres northeast of Guwahati, and is the largest of the north bank cities with a population exceeding 100,000 as per Metropolitan Census 2011Website

Colleges in Assam
Colleges affiliated to Gauhati University
Educational institutions established in 1965
1965 establishments in Assam